George Christopher Barnaby Honeyman (born 8 September 1994) is an English professional footballer who plays as a midfielder for  club Millwall.

A product of Sunderland's youth academy, Honeyman made his professional debut in February 2015. He had a brief spell on loan with Gateshead during the 2015–16 season before returning and assuming the captaincy in 2018. He joined Hull City a year later.

Career

Sunderland
Born in Prudhoe, Northumberland, Honeyman joined Sunderland's academy in 2004 at the age of 10. He made his first-team debut on 15 February 2015 in the fifth round of the FA Cup, replacing Ricky Álvarez for the final four minutes of a 2–0 away loss to Bradford City. Manager Gus Poyet admitted that Honeyman would have been put on earlier had the team not had injury concerns, admitting that "George would have been coming on earlier because we needed a bit of his running between the lines and ability to make runs". He was included in the matchday squad for one Premier League match that season, remaining unused in a 1–1 draw to Stoke City.

On 16 October 2015, Honeyman was loaned to National League club Gateshead for a month, as fellow Sunderland youngster Lynden Gooch had done the previous season. He made his league debut the following day, starting in a 2–2 home draw against Altrincham. On 31 October, he netted the first goal of his career, the winner in a 3–2 win away to Boreham Wood.

He scored his first goal for Sunderland in a 1–0 EFL Cup first round win to Bury on 10 August 2017. Six days later, he scored his first league goal to open a 1–1 draw away to Sheffield Wednesday. In August 2018, as Sunderland prepared for the League One season following a second successive relegation, Honeyman was appointed captain at the age of 23 by new manager Jack Ross, as John O'Shea left for Reading. He became the first academy-produced player to be club captain since Michael Gray.

Hull City
Honeyman signed for Championship club Hull City on 2 August 2019 on a three-year contract with the option of a further year for an undisclosed fee — ending his 15-year association with Sunderland. He made his debut on 10 August when he came on as a 79th-minute substitute in a 2−1 home win against Reading.

In April 2021 he was nominated for the EFL League One Player of the Season, and on 29 April 2021 was named in the 2020–21 EFL League One Team of the Season at the league's annual awards ceremony.

On 18 May 2022, Hull City exercised an option for an additional year on his contract.

Millwall
On 28 June 2022, Honeyman joined Millwall for an undisclosed fee, signing a long-term contract with the club.

Club statistics

Honours
Sunderland
EFL Trophy runner-up: 2018–19
Hull City

 EFL League One: 2020–21 EFL League One

Individual
PFA Team of the Year: 2020–21 League One
EFL League One Team of the Season: 2020–21
 Hull City Player of the Year: 2020–21
 Hull City Players' Player of the Year: 2020–21
 Hull City Supporters' Player of the Year: 2020–21

References

External links

Profile at the Hull City A.F.C. website

1994 births
Living people
People from Prudhoe
Footballers from Northumberland
English footballers
Association football midfielders
Sunderland A.F.C. players
Gateshead F.C. players
Hull City A.F.C. players
Millwall F.C. players
National League (English football) players
Premier League players
English Football League players